Edna Mae Wilson (1880–1960) was an American silent film actress. Signed by the Thanhouser Company based in New Rochelle, New York in 1913, she starred in about 15 films between 1913 and 1920, sometimes in only one short film a year and often credited alongside William Garwood. She died in New York on July 23, 1960.

Filmography
Once a Plumber (1920) .... Kate Beard
A Man's Country (1919) .... Ruth Kemp
Maggie Pepper (1919) .... Claire Darkin
Who Knows? (1917) (as Edna May Wilson) .... Dusk Weaver
The Fall of a Nation (1916)
The Education of Mr. Pipp (1914) (as Edna Brun) .... Julia Pipp
A Diamond in the Rough (1914/I)
The Hunchback (1914)
Just a Song at Twilight (1914)
A Turn of the Cards (1914)
The Village Blacksmith

External links
 

American film actresses
American silent film actresses
1880 births
1960 deaths
20th-century American actresses